The Big Spring Vietnam Memorial is a war memorial located in Big Spring, Texas, United States, honoring American servicemen (especially those local to Big Spring) who gave their lives, became prisoners of war or went missing in action in the Vietnam War.

The  park surrounding the memorial also contains a UH-1 "Huey" MEDEVAC helicopter, an F-4E Phantom II fighter jet, an AH-1 Cobra attack helicopter, and a M60 Patton tank.

The Gold Star Memorial Chapel built on the site displays pictures of service men from Big Spring and Howard County that were killed in action and missing in action.  It also displays pictures of service men killed in action from the surrounding area. Also pictured are men and women that served their country whether they were in a combat zone or not.

External links
 Official website

Vietnam War monuments and memorials in the United States
Monuments and memorials in Texas
Buildings and structures in Howard County, Texas
1991 sculptures
Granite sculptures in Texas
1991 establishments in Texas